North Philadelphia station is a rapid transit station on SEPTA's Broad Street Line. It serves both local trains and Broad-Ridge Spur trains. It is located in Philadelphia under North Broad Street with headhouses at Glenwood Avenue and Lehigh Avenue; the station takes its name from this portion of the city in spite of being one of several stations serving the area. It is adjacent to North Broad station (served by SEPTA Regional Rail) and North Philadelphia station (served by Regional Rail and Amtrak).

History 

North Philadelphia station opened with the initial segment of the Broad Street Line on September 1, 1928, in the growing North Philadelphia area. The Pennsylvania Railroad's North Philadelphia station and the Reading Railroad's then-under-construction North Broad Street station were nearby; a direct passage was built from the subway station to the pedestrian underpass at North Broad Street station.

As the neighborhood deteriorated over the decades, the passage was closed; the headhouses at Glenwood Avenue became exit-only. Around 2005, SEPTA embarked on a $17.7 million reconstruction of the station which included five new headhouses (including the ability to enter from Glenwood), elevators for handicapped accessibility, new signage, and improved amenities. The work was originally to be completed by in fall 2007. However, by the end of 2007, the headhouses were complete but the elevators were not yet installed. The rebuilt station was dedicated on April 29, 2010.

Station layout

References

External links 

SEPTA Broad Street Line stations
Railway stations in the United States opened in 1928
North Philadelphia BSL
1928 establishments in Pennsylvania
Railway stations located underground in Pennsylvania